Al J Thompson (born 1980) is a Jamaica-born American photographer, living in New York City.

Life and work
Thompson was born on the island of Jamaica. In 1996, aged 16, he moved to Spring Valley in Rockland County, New York. He now lives in New York City.

His first book, Remnants of an Exodus (2021), was made in Spring Valley and is about gentrification.

Publications
Remnants of an Exodus. New York (state): Gnomic, 2021. With an essay by Shane Rocheleau, "Gathering Remnants".

References

External links

21st-century American photographers
Photographers from New York (state)
Jamaican photographers
Date of birth missing (living people)
1980 births
Living people